Piper fimbriulatum is a species of plant in the family Piperaceae. It is found in Colombia, Costa Rica, and Panama. It is threatened by habitat loss.

References

fimbriulatum
Near threatened plants
Myrmecophytes
Taxonomy articles created by Polbot